Henry North may refer to:

Henry North (cricketer) (1883-1952), New Zealand cricketer
Henry Ringling North (1909–1993), American businessman and circus proprietor
Henry North (died 1620) (1556–1620), MP for Cambridgeshire and Cambridge
Sir Henry North, 1st Baronet (c. 1609–1671), English politician
Sir Henry North, 2nd Baronet (died 1695), MP for Suffolk, of the North baronets

See also
North (surname)